CJSL is a Canadian radio station licensed to Estevan, Saskatchewan, and serves the southeastern portion of the province. CJSL broadcasts a country format as well as live sports.

The station is currently owned by Golden West Broadcasting, which also owns Estevan's two FM stations, CHSN-FM and CKSE-FM. Hockey games involving the senior Big 6 Hockey League are broadcast by the station in the winter, while in the summer the station carries Toronto Blue Jays baseball.

History 
CJSL began as a satellite station of Weyburn's CFSL after the Soo Line Broadcasting Company Ltd. applied to use the frequency of 1280 kHz. In August 1961, CJSL signed on the air with a power of 1,000 watts, effectively becoming Estevan's first radio station. The original studios were located at 1235 4th Street, Estevan, before moving to 5th Street in 1969.

In 1977, CJSL applied to the CRTC to increase full-time power from 1,000 watts to 10,000 watts. The increase was approved in principle by the CRTC, but a final decision was delayed. The delay was caused by concerns from CJME Regina, who then operated at a frequency of 1300 kHz. The power increase was granted in 1978 after an agreement was reached with CJME.

In the 1980s, the station became known as Super Country CJSL.

In 1995, both CJSL and CFSL were sold to Frontier City Broadcasting Company, now known as Golden West Broadcasting. The station dropped the "Super Country" moniker and became known simply as CJ 1280, using the tagline "Today's best country, and your all time favourites".

On May 28, 2014, Golden West Broadcasting received CRTC approval to change CJSL's frequency to 1150 kHz. In November 2014, CJSL switched frequencies to its current frequency at 1150 kHz.

References

External links
CJ 1150
 

 

Jsl
Estevan
Jsl
Jsl
Radio stations established in 1961
1961 establishments in Saskatchewan